GST may refer to:

Taxes
 General sales tax
 Goods and Services Tax, the name for the value-added tax in several jurisdictions:
 Goods and services tax (Australia)
 Goods and Services Tax (Canada)
 Goods and Services Tax (Hong Kong)
Goods and Services Tax (India)
Goods and Services Tax (Malaysia)
Goods and Services Tax (New Zealand)
Goods and Services Tax (Singapore)
 Generation-skipping transfer tax, in the United States

Science and technology

Computing
 Generalized suffix tree
 GeSbTe, a phase-change material
 GST Computer Systems, a group of British software developers
 GStreamer, a multimedia framework

Vehicles
 GST Catalina, a Soviet flying boat
 Vision GST, a Mercedes-Benz concept car

Other uses in science and technology
 Gene-specific tag (also referred to as SNP)
General set theory
 General strain theory, in sociology
 General systems theory
 Generalized structure tensor
Global surface temperature
 Glutathione S-transferase
 Goode Solar Telescope, in California

Timekeeping
 Gulf Standard Time, in the Middle East
 Greenwich Sidereal Time, used in astronomy
 Galileo System Time

Businesses and organizations
 Danish Geodata Agency (Geodatastyrelsen)
 GST Computer Systems, a group of British software developers
 General Staff (Sweden), a former agency of the Government of Sweden
 German Steel Trust, a German steel company
 Gerolsteiner (cycling team)
 Gesellschaft für Sport und Technik, a former East German mass organization providing mandatory pre-military training
 Groupe socialiste des travailleurs du Québec, a defunct political movement in Canada
 Gulf States Toyota Distributors, an American automobile distributor
 SIES Graduate School of Technology, in Mumbai, India

Other uses
 Greystone (CIA operation)
 Grand Southern Trunk Road, in India
 G-TELP Speaking Test, English language test
 Gustavus Airport, in Alaska